Achan Kombath Amma Varambath is a 1995 Indian Malayalam-language film directed by the duo Anil Babu and produced by Saji Thomas. The film stars Murali, Bharathi Vishnuvardhan, Sukumari and Jagathy Sreekumar in the lead roles. The film has musical score by S. P. Venkatesh. The film was a remake of Tamil film Varavu Nalla Uravu.

Cast
The list below contains each actor and their role below.
Murali as Chandrasekhara Menon
Bharathi Vishnuvardhan as Parvathi
Sukumari as Harikrishnan's neighbour
Jagathy Sreekumar as Surendran
Thilakan as Mahendran Thampi
Ashokan as Harikrishnan
Kalpana as Swayamprabha
Baiju as Gopikrishnan
Bindu Panicker as Syamala
Chippy as Radhika
Geetha Vijayan as Maya
KPAC Sunny as Advocate
M. S. Thripunithura as Sharady
Paravoor Bharathan as Maya's father
Shammi Thilakan as Rajendran
Sreenath as Balan
Renuka as Sumithra
Master Vishal as Unnikuttan
Meena Ganesh as Maya's mother

Soundtrack
The music was composed by S. P. Venkatesh and the lyrics were written by Gireesh Puthenchery.

References

External links
 

1995 films
1990s Malayalam-language films
Indian drama films
Malayalam remakes of Tamil films
Films directed by Babu Narayanan